Coloane (Cantonese: Lou Wan) is a former island in Macau that is united with the island of Taipa by an area of reclaimed land known as Cotai. It is located at the southern part of Macau. Administratively, the boundaries of the traditional civil parish of São Francisco Xavier are coterminous with that of Coloane.

Etymology
Coloane was known in Cantonese as Gau Ou Saan (九澳山 lit. "Nine-inlet Mountain" or transcribed in Portuguese as Ká-Hó) and Yim Jou Waan (鹽灶灣, lit. "Salt-stove Bay"). The Portuguese name "Coloane" is derived from the Cantonese pronunciation of Gwo Lou Waan (過路環, lit. "Passing-road Ring").

Geography
The highest points in Macau are eastern and central Coloane, with the highest point being the  Coloane Alto (Portuguese: Alto de Coloane).

In the past, Coloane was separated from Taipa by the Seac Pai Bay, which was crossed by a  causeway, the Estrada do Istmo, connecting Coloane to Taipa. However land reclamation has physically connected the two islands and a new area for development called Cotai has been built between Taipa and Coloane, which is home to the Cotai Strip and several other casino projects.

The eastern Hac Sa Beach (Portuguese: Baía de Hác Sá) and the southern Cheoc Van Bay (Portuguese: Baía de Cheoc Van) are popular swimming beaches.

History
From the Song dynasty onwards and until the Portuguese arrival in 1864, Coloane was a sea salt farm for China. After their arrival, the Portuguese made Macau an important trading port, but Coloane remained largely deserted, and was used as a base by pirates until 1910. The island became more populated after the Estrada do Istmo causeway connecting Coloane with Taipa was completed in 1969.

Coloane Village

Coloane Village (Portuguese: Vila de Coloane), located on the southwestern coast of Coloane, is the island's main settlement.

The village centers on Eduardo Marques Square, which is a rectangle paved in cobblestones that are black, white and yellow, laid out in a wavy pattern reminiscent of the sea. The square faces a seaside promenade that traces the channel dividing Macau from the hills of China proper. At the eastern end of the square stands the Chapel of St. Francis Xavier, built in 1928.

A Tam Kung Temple is located at the southern end of Avenida de Cinco de Outubro (十月初五馬路).

Temples (from north to south)
 Sam Seng Temple (三圣宫), also called Kam Fa Temple (金花庙), located at 2 Rua dos Navegantes in Coloane Village. Dedicated to Kam Fa, Kun Iam and Va Kuong, it was built in 1865.
 Kun Iam Temple (Coloane), located at Travessa do Caetano.
 Old Tin Hau Temple (天后古廟) in Coloane Village
 Tam Kung Temple in Coloane Village. Dedicated to Lord Tam, a Taoist god of seafarers, it was built in 1862.
Churches
 Chapel of St. Francis Xavier (聖方濟聖堂), of the Freguesia de São Francisco Xavier (聖方濟堂區). The chapel, built in 1928, is located on the southwestern coast of the island and stands near a monument commemorating a victory over pirates in 1910. The chapel used to contain some of the most sacred Christian relics in Asia, including the remains of 26 foreign and Japanese Catholic priests who were crucified in Nagasaki in 1597, as well as those of some of the Japanese Christians who were killed during the Shimabara Rebellion in 1637. They are now located in the Museum of Sacred Art, opened in 1996 next to the Ruins of St. Paul's. Another relic was a bone from the arm of St. Francis Xavier, who died in 1552 on Shangchuan Island,  from Macau. This relic has been transferred to St. Joseph's Church.

Lai Chi Vun Village 

Estrada de Lai Chi Vun begins at the intersection Estrada de Seac Pai Van and Estrada do Campo in the north and ends at Largo do Cais in the south. The towering banyan tree at the northern end of the marks the northern entrance to Lai Chi Vun Village (荔枝碗村), whose name is associated with its abundance in lychee trees in the past and its bowl-shaped bay.

The shipyards that once lay beyond the village are nowadays left in disuse. The single-storey business premises of Veng Lok Shipyard and of Association of Shipbuilders of Macao-Taipa-Coloane are located inside the small courtyard to the right of the road atop the hill. All the way down the road to the western side is the one-storey office building of the Customs office of Coloane in Portuguese architectural style.

Coloane Pier, which was once the only entry and exit point of Coloane is located along the waterfront facing Largo do Cais the southern end of the road.

The Lai Chi Vun shipyards are being evaluated to determine whether they meet the MSAR's legal definition of cultural relics. The site is potentially significant because Macau's shipbuilding industry began at the shipyards and because of the formation of a historical village near the area.

Tourist attractions

Temples
 Hung Shing Temple in Hac Sa Village
 Sam Seng Temple (三聖站廟), in the Ka Ho (九澳) area, in the northeastern part of the island
 Kun Iam Temple (Ka Ho)
 A-Ma Statue (媽祖像), built on October 28, 1998 (lunar calendar: September 9)
Churches
 Chapel of St. Francis Xavier
  Church of Our Lady of Sorrows (九澳七苦聖母小堂), in the Ká-Hó area
Others
 "Fernando", a Portuguese restaurant at Baía de Hác Sá, is famous amongst locals in Macau and visitors from Hong Kong
 Hac Sa Park
 Macao Giant Panda Pavilion
 Natural and Agrarian Museum
 Seac Pai Van Park

Government
 Correctional Services Bureau

Infrastructure
 Coloane A Power Station
 Coloane B Power Station

Healthcare
Health centres operated by the Macau government in Coloane include Posto de Saúde Coloane (路環衛生站) and Posto de Saúde Provisório de Seac Pai Van de Coloane (路環石排灣臨時衛生站).

Education

Public schools:
 Escola Luso-Chinesa de Coloane (路環中葡學校) - Special education

Subsidized private schools:
  (雷鳴道主教紀念學校) - Primary and secondary school
 Escola de São José de Ká Hó (九澳聖若瑟學校) - Preschool through junior high school

Macao Public Library operates the Coloane Library (Biblioteca de Coloane; 路環圖書館), which occupies  space in the former Coloane Public Elementary School (路環公局市立學校), a Portuguese-style building. In 1983 the building was renovated so it could serve as a library.

Transport

Coloane is served by buses and taxis.

See also 
Kai Ho Port
Macau Prison
List of islands and peninsulas of Macau

References

External links 

Google Maps: Macau / Coloane